Moreland Buslines is a bus operator in Melbourne, Australia. It operates two routes under contract to Public Transport Victoria.

History

In 1955, Clarrie Wright began operating a Reo bus on routes 510 Melville Road to High Street and 511 Essendon North to Sydney Road, along with six other operators. By 1969, Wright had bought out the other operators and formed Moreland Buslines.

In 1973, Thompson Roadlines was acquired and Moreland entered the coach charter market, later operating safari tours to Central Australia. In July 1985, Taranto Bus Lines was acquired, which operated route 512 Strathmore to East Coburg, followed by Geographical Tours and Bakers Bus Lines. In 1996, Landmark Tours was acquired and Moreland began to operate services under contract to Greyhound Pioneer Australia to Sydney and Brisbane. Although it no longer operates interstate services, Moreland continues to provide depot facilities for Greyhound Australia. 

In 2007, the Wright family acquired a 50% share in neighbouring Broadmeadows Bus Service but, in 2011, that company was sold to Dom Sita of Kastoria Bus Lines.

In the early 2010s, Moreland acquired GBS in Wonthaggi, and in early 2013, Phillip Island Buslines was acquired. Wonthaggi and Philip Island then became South Coast Bus and Phillip Island Bus respectively.

Fleet
As at January 2023, the fleet consisted of 34 buses and coaches. The coach fleet livery is off-white with light and dark green stripes, with route buses painted in the Public Transport Victoria orange and white livery.

References

External links

Company website
Previous company website

Bus companies of Victoria (Australia)
Bus transport in Melbourne
Transport companies established in 1955
1955 establishments in Australia